Askarabad (also Romanized as ʿAskarābād) is a village in Virmuni Rural District, in the Central District of Astara County, Gilan Province, Iran. At the 2006 census, its population was 137, in 35 families.

References 

Populated places in Astara County